Sky Living Loves (formerly Living Loves) was a British television channel owned by British Sky Broadcasting. It launched on 5 July 2010 and closed on 21 February 2012. It was the sister channel of Sky Living and Sky Livingit.

History
On 1 July 2010, a preview for Living Loves replaced Living +2 on Sky and Virgin Media, ahead of the channels launch at 3pm on 5 July. The channel showed comedy and drama programmes that has recently aired on Sky Living, allowing viewers to watch shows again or catch up on series.

It was announced on 25 October 2010, that Living would be rebranded as Sky Living in early 2011 and move EPG positions on Sky from channel 112 to 107 after Sky1 and before Sky Atlantic. As part of the move, Living Loves was rebranded on 1 February 2011 as Sky Living Loves.

On 5 September 2011, Sky Living Loves began broadcasting 24 hours a day, up from the previous 3pm to 2am broadcasting hours.

In November 2011, it was announced that Sky Living Loves would close on 1 February 2012 as part of a restructure of the Sky-owned channels. However, the restructure was delayed until 21 February 2012, with the channel closing at midnight.

Sky Living Loves was replaced by the new Sky Sports F1 channel, while the channel's EPG slot on Sky was given to Sky Arts 2.

Former logos

References

Living TV Group channels
Television channels and stations established in 2010
Defunct television channels in the United Kingdom
Television channels and stations disestablished in 2012